Indecent behavior may refer to:
Indecent exposure
Lascivious behavior